From Beyond is the debut studio album by American death metal band Massacre, released in 1991 on Earache Records. The album was re-released with a different cover (original is red) and the Inhuman Condition EP as bonus tracks.

The album was recorded in March 1991 at Morrisound Recording in Tampa, Florida.

"Corpsegrinder" was originally recorded by the band Death, of which all members of Massacre have been a part in the past.

The album's title is based on H. P. Lovecraft's the short story of the same name, and the cover art was painted by Ed Repka.

The band's vocalist, Kam Lee, hates the original pink album cover art done by Ed Repka and the changing of the band logo as he claims it "looks like the Superman logo."

Critical reception 

In 2005, From Beyond was ranked number 288 in Rock Hard magazine's book The 500 Greatest Rock & Metal Albums of All Time.

Track listing 
All lyrics written by Kam Lee, all music by Rick Rozz, unless stated.

The original vinyl release had a bonus 7" single:

Personnel 
Massacre
 Kam Lee – vocals
 Rick Rozz – guitar
Terry Butler – bass
 Bill Andrews – drums

Additional musicians
 Walter Trachsler – rhythm guitar (uncredited)

Production
 Colin Richardson and Massacre – production
 Scott Burns – engineering
 Edward J. Repka – artwork and logo

According to Mike Borders, Robby Goodwin wrote the song "Biohazard" but was not credited.

References 

1991 debut albums
Massacre (metal band) albums
Albums with cover art by Ed Repka
Earache Records albums